Haut-Bugey Agglomération is a communauté d'agglomération  situated in the Ain department and the Auvergne-Rhône-Alpes region of France. Created on 1 January 2014, it is composed of 42 communes and seated in Oyonnax. Its area is 688.8 km2. Its population was 63,099 in 2018, of which 22,336 in Oyonnax proper. Originally a communauté de communes, the intercommunality became a communauté d'agglomération on 1 January 2018.

History 
On 1 January 2019 and by prefectural decree of 19 November 2018, the intercommunality absorbed the communauté de communes du plateau d'Hauteville increasing the number of communes to 42.

Composition 
The agglomération is composed of the 42 following communes:

Administration

Seat 
The seat of the communauté de communes is located at 57 Rue René Nicod in Oyonnax, 01100.

Elected councillors 
The conseil communautaire of the communauté d'agglomération is composed of 79 councillor representing each of the member communes and elected for six-year terms. The number of council seats each commune receives is proportional based upon their population as follows:

President

References 

Intercommunalities of Ain
Agglomeration communities in France